Domain testing is one of the most widely practiced software testing techniques. It is a method of selecting a small number of test cases from a nearly infinite group of candidate test cases. Domain knowledge plays a very critical role while testing domain-specific work.

References

Sources
Books

 
 

Journals

External links

Software testing